Taqiabad (also Romanized as Taqīābād; also known as Takīābād) is a village in Esfandar Rural District, Bahman District, Abarkuh County, Yazd Province, Iran. At the 2006 census, its population was 255, in 66 families.

References 

Populated places in Abarkuh County